Vincent John "Vince" Smith (28 February 1938 – 24 April 2008) was an Australian politician.

Smith was born in London. In 1982 he was elected to the Tasmanian Legislative Assembly as a Liberal member for Braddon, serving until his defeat in 1986.

References

1938 births
Liberal Party of Australia members of the Parliament of Tasmania
Members of the Tasmanian House of Assembly
British emigrants to Australia
2008 deaths
20th-century Australian politicians